Acqui-hiring or Acq-hiring (a portmanteau of "acquisition" and "hiring", also called talent acquisition) is a neologism which describes the process of acquiring a company primarily to recruit its employees, rather than to gain control of its products or services. Ben Zimmer traced the derivation of the phrase to a blog post in May 2005.

Talent acquisitions can provide a relatively favorable exit strategy for employees, with the prestige of being bought by a larger company, combined with the typical process of hiring. A risk to talent acquisitions are employees that are not interested in working within a corporate environment — which may cause them to defect elsewhere.

By the early 2010s, acqui-hiring had become increasingly common in venture capital-backed startup companies, especially within the competitive technology sector (where skilled software engineers working for startups were considered lucrative). By March 2013, Facebook was the largest performer of talent acquisitions, with 12 over the previous five fiscal quarters. One such Facebook purchase in 2009, FriendFeed, brought several high-profile Google alumni into the company, including Bret Taylor — who became Facebook's chief technology officer shortly after the purchase. Twitter, Yahoo!, and Google ranked alongside Facebook as a similarly major user of talent acquisitions.

Typically, a company that performs a talent acquisition does not show an interest in the products and services of the target, which results in them being discontinued upon the purchase (so that their staff will focus exclusively on incorporating their knowledge into their new employer's projects) or some time afterward. The file sharing service Drop.io was shut down after its 2010 purchase by Facebook, while FriendFeed was left dormant (with no new feature development and a slowly shrinking user base) until 2015, when it was discontinued.

The opposite of acqui-hiring is also possible; when Cisco closed its Flip Video subsidiary despite good sales, two years after acquiring the company in 2009, David Pogue of The New York Times speculated "Maybe, in fact, that was Cisco’s plan all along. Buy the beloved Flip for its technology, then shut it down and fire 550 people".

References 

Recruitment
Mergers and acquisitions